The president of Rhodesia was the head of state of Rhodesia from 1970 to 1979. As Rhodesia reckoned itself a parliamentary republic rather than a presidential republic at the time, the president's post was almost entirely ceremonial, and the real power continued to be vested in Rhodesia's prime minister, Ian Smith. Two individuals held the office of president, while two others served as acting presidents. Most were of British descent, but Clifford Dupont, the longest-serving, was of Huguenot stock.

As with Rhodesia itself, the position lacked international recognition for the entire period.

Rhodesia was internationally recognised as a British colony until 1980.

Origins
On 11 November 1965, Ian Smith's Rhodesian Front Government proclaimed the Unilateral Declaration of Independence (UDI) from the United Kingdom. On orders from the UK, the then-Governor of Southern Rhodesia, Sir Humphrey Gibbs, immediately sacked Smith and his cabinet. This action was ignored by Smith, who stated that the UDI brought into immediate force a new constitution which dispensed with the position of Governor – and with it, his reserve power to sack them.
 
The new constitution reconstituted Rhodesia as a Commonwealth realm. It recognised Queen Elizabeth II as "Queen of Rhodesia," with a governor-general as her representative in the country. In lieu of the appointment of a governor-general, an "Officer Administering the Government" would exercise the functions of the governor-general.

Smith had intended to name Deputy Prime Minister Clifford Dupont as Governor-General. However, Queen Elizabeth II would not even consider Smith's "advice" to appoint Dupont as her viceregal representative. Instead, Whitehall insisted that Gibbs was the Queen's only legitimate representative, and hence the only lawful authority in what it still maintained was the Colony of Southern Rhodesia – a position backed by most of the international community.

Republic
For five years, Smith and his government continued to profess loyalty to Queen Elizabeth II and recognised her as Rhodesia's head of state. Indeed, the UDI announcement ended with the words "God Save The Queen." However, in 1969, Smith decided to sever links with the British Crown, by making the country a republic. At a referendum that year, the mostly white electorate voted overwhelmingly in favour of a republic.

Rhodesia was formally proclaimed a republic in 1970, and Dupont assumed the office of president. Smith's position as prime minister remained unchanged. A presidential flag was adopted, featuring a blue field with the coat of arms in the centre. Following the model of the state president of South Africa, Rhodesian presidents had little de facto executive power, and mostly acted on the advice of the prime minister.

Dupont resigned due to ill health in 1975. He was succeeded as president in 1976 by John Wrathall, who died in office in 1978. In 1979 there was an Internal Settlement, which saw a black majority government for the first time, and the country was renamed Zimbabwe Rhodesia. Josiah Zion Gumede was chosen as president. Like the UDI and the declaration of a republic, Zimbabwe Rhodesia was unrecognised internationally and in 1979, Britain resumed control of the rebel colony under the Lancaster House Agreement. Britain appointed Lord Soames as governor until the country became independent within the Commonwealth of Nations as Zimbabwe on 18 April 1980.

List of presidents of Rhodesia
Parties

Symbols

Notes

Timeline

See also
Governor of Southern Rhodesia
Prime Minister of Rhodesia
President of Zimbabwe Rhodesia
President of Zimbabwe

References

External links
Humphrey Gibbs, 87, of Rhodesia And a Foe of White Rebels, Dies

 
Rhodesia
Presidents
1970 establishments in Rhodesia
1979 disestablishments in Rhodesia